Spatial thinking may refer to:

Spatial cognition
Spatial memory
Spatial intelligence (disambiguation)